Kelatorphan is a drug which acts as a powerful and complete inhibitor of nearly all of the enzymes responsible for catabolism of the endogenous enkephalins, including neutral endopeptidase (NEP), dipeptidyl peptidase III (DPP3), aminopeptidase N (APN), and angiotensin-converting enzyme (ACE). In mice, with the intracerebroventricular co-administration of a 50 µg dose of kelatorphan (this route is necessary because kelatorphan is incapable of crossing the blood-brain-barrier) hence alongside exogenous [Met]enkephalin (ED50 approximately 10 ng), it potentiated the analgesic effects of the latter by 50,000 times. Kelatorphan also displays potent antinociceptive effects alone, and does not depress respiration, although at high doses it actually increases it.

See also 
 Enkephalinase inhibitor

References 

Amino acids
Analgesics
Enkephalinase inhibitors
Opioids
Peripherally selective drugs